Gorzędziej  (formerly ) is a village in the administrative district of Gmina Subkowy, within Tczew County, Pomeranian Voivodeship, in northern Poland.

The village has a population of 542.

History

A fortification is known to have existed here at least since some time before 1233, since it is known that it was reinforced 1233-1236 by Duke Sambor II with the help of the Teutonic Order. Sometime later it was captured  by his brother, Swietopelk II. In 1282 his son Mestwin II gave the castle to the Bishop of Płock. The bishop founded a town that grew up around the castle. In 1312 the town was bought by the Teutonic Order and was deprived of its town rights. It was later a royal village of the Polish Crown, administratively located in the Tczew County in the Pomeranian Voivodeship. The village suffered much damage in the Deluge and was almost completely abandoned. In 1905, the town had 436 inhabitants; in 1943, 435. During the German occupation of Poland (World War II), Gorzędziej was one of the sites of executions of Poles, carried out by the Germans in 1939 as part of the Intelligenzaktion.

References

Populated places on the Vistula
Villages in Tczew County